Zoo (stylized in all caps) is the thirteenth studio album by American rapper Russ. It was released on September 7, 2018, by Diemon and Columbia Records. The album was announced on August 13, 2018. The official tracklist was released on September 4, just three days before the album’s release. On September 22, 2018, the album debuted at number four on the US Billboard 200.

Critical reception

HipHopDX gave the album a rating of 3.8 out of 5, with writer Scott Glaysher stating: "Zoo lacks outright smash hits but it’s clear Russ’ focus for this sophomore offering was to make a project that was better-rounded than his debut – so in that case, mission accomplished."

Commercial performance
Zoo debuted at number four on the US Billboard 200 chart, earning 79,000 album-equivalent units (including 57,000 in pure album sales) in its first week. This is Russ' second top-ten album.

Track listing
All tracks produced by Russ, with the exception of the track "The Flute Song", which was produced by Scott Storch and co-produced by Avedon.

Charts

Weekly charts

Year-end charts

References

2018 albums
Columbia Records albums
Hip hop albums by American artists
Russ (rapper) albums